Eugene Paul "Gene" Johnson (September 18, 1935August 4, 1997) was an American football defensive back in the National Football League for the Philadelphia Eagles, the Minnesota Vikings, and the New York Giants.  He played college football at the University of Cincinnati and was drafted in the ninth round of the 1959 NFL Draft.

1935 births
1997 deaths
American football defensive backs
Cincinnati Bearcats football players
Philadelphia Eagles players
Minnesota Vikings players
New York Giants players
People from Clay, West Virginia